The Central Committee of the Workers' Party of South Korea (WPSK) was elected by the party congress on 24 November 1946 through the merger of the Communist Party of South Korea, New People's Party of Korea and a faction of the People's Party of Korea, and remained in session until the merger of the WPSK with the Workers' Party of North Korea on 24 June 1949. In between party congresses the Central Committee was the highest decision-making institution in the WPSK. The Central Committee was not a permanent institution and delegated day-to-day work to elected bodies, such as the Political Committee and the Standing Committee in the case of this Central Committee. It convened meetings, known as "Plenary Session of the [term] Central Committee", to discuss major policies. A plenary session could be attended by non-members. These meetings were known as "Enlarged Plenary Session".

Members

References

Footnotes

Bibliography

 
 

1st Central Committee of the Workers' Party of South Korea
1946 in South Korea